Huguenot Memorial Bridge is located in Henrico County and the independent city of Richmond, Virginia. It carries State Route 147 across the former Chesapeake and Ohio Railway (now the James River Line of CSX Transportation), the James River and Kanawha Canal, and the James River in the Fall Line region above the head of navigation at Richmond.

The Huguenot Memorial Bridge, which connects Southside (Richmond, Virginia) to urban Richmond, was completed in 1950. The 2900 ft (884 m) span replaced the low-level Westham Bridge which had been built as a toll bridge in 1911. The old bridge was subject to flooding and was inadequate for traffic in the growing suburban area.

The Huguenot Memorial Bridge was named in honor of the French Huguenot settlers who came to the area in the 18th century to escape religious persecution in France. It is owned by the Virginia Department of Transportation (VDOT) and is the westernmost bridge over the James River in the metropolitan Richmond area that is open to pedestrians.

The 1950 original bridge was facing significant structural issues. After years of problems maintaining the deck and pavement, as of 2008, a replacement was included in the limited number of high priority projects underway with the Virginia Department of Transportation (VDOT). Construction began in 2010 and completed in 2013.

References

External links
Richmond.com article on Richmond's River Crossings
VDOT website for Huguenot Bridge Reconstruction

Transportation in Henrico County, Virginia
Bridges over the James River (Virginia)
Bridges completed in 1950
Bridges in Richmond, Virginia
Buildings and structures in Henrico County, Virginia
Monuments and memorials in Virginia
Road bridges in Virginia